Janssens is a Dutch surname equivalent to Johnson. It is the second most common surname in Belgium,  while in the Netherlands, the forms Jansen and Janssen are more common. People with this surname include:

Abraham Janssens (c. 1573 – 1632), Flemish painter
A. Cecile J.W. Janssens (1968–2022), Dutch epidemiologist
Aster Janssens (born 2001), Belgian footballer
Cas Janssens (born 1944), Dutch footballer
Charles Janssens (1906–1986), Belgian film actor
Chris Janssens (born 1969), Belgian footballer
Christophe Janssens (born 1998), Belgian footballer
Émile Janssens (1902–1989), Belgian general and commander of the Force Publique
Corneille Janssens (1585–1638), Flemish bishop and founder of Jansenism
Cornelis Janssens van Ceulen (1593–1661), Dutch portrait painter
Francis Janssens (1843–1897), Dutch-born Archbishop of New Orleans.
Franciscus Janssens, General Abbot.
Evan Janssens, Professional Guitarist and philosopher.
Frans Janssens (born 1945), Belgian footballer
Frans Alfons Janssens, (1865–1924), Belgian biologist who first described chromosomal crossover
Hieronymus Janssens, Flemish painter from the Baroque 
Jan Janssens (August 1590-after 1650), Flemish Baroque painter
Jan Willem Janssens (1762–1838), Dutch soldier and statesman
Jean Janssens (fl. 1920), Belgian racing cyclist
Jean Janssens (born 1944), Belgian footballer
Jean-Baptiste Janssens (1889–1964), twenty-seventh Superior General of the Society of Jesus
Jill Janssens (born 2003), Belgian footballer
Johann Hermann Janssens (1783–1853), Belgian theologian
Kevin Janssens (disambiguation), several people
Ko Janssens (1889–1970), Dutch boxer
Marcel Janssens (1931–1992), Belgian road bicycle racer
Mark Janssens (born 1968), Canadian ice hockey forward
Mathias Janssens (born 1998), Belgian footballer
Patrick Janssens (born 1956), Belgian politician
Victor Honoré Janssens (1658–1736), Flemish painter

See also
Jansen (surname)
Janssen (disambiguation)

Dutch-language surnames
Patronymic surnames
Surnames from given names